Edward Behr may refer to:
 Edward Behr (journalist) (1926–2007), British journalist
 Edward Behr (food writer) (born 1951), American food writer